The Gopher protocol is a communication protocol designed for distributing, searching, and retrieving documents in Internet Protocol networks. The design of the Gopher protocol and user interface is menu-driven, and presented an alternative to the World Wide Web in its early stages, but ultimately fell into disfavor, yielding to HTTP. The Gopher ecosystem is often regarded as the effective predecessor of the World Wide Web.

Usage
The Gopher protocol was invented by a team led by Mark P. McCahill at the University of Minnesota.  It offers some features not natively supported by the Web and imposes a much stronger hierarchy on the documents it stores. Its text menu interface is well-suited to computing environments that rely heavily on remote text-oriented computer terminals, which were still common at the time of its creation in 1991, and the simplicity of its protocol facilitated a wide variety of client implementations. More recent Gopher revisions and graphical clients added support for multimedia.

Gopher's hierarchical structure provided a platform for the first large-scale electronic library connections. The Gopher protocol is still in use by enthusiasts, and although it has been almost entirely supplanted by the Web, a small population of actively-maintained servers remains.

Origins
Gopher system was released in mid-1991 by Mark P. McCahill, Farhad Anklesaria, Paul Lindner, Daniel Torrey, and Bob Alberti of the University of Minnesota in the United States. Its central goals were, as stated in :

 A file-like hierarchical arrangement that would be familiar to users.
 A simple syntax.
 A system that can be created quickly and inexpensively.
 Extensibility of the file system metaphor; allowing addition of searches for example.

Gopher combines document hierarchies with collections of services, including WAIS, the Archie and Veronica search engines, and gateways to other information systems such as File Transfer Protocol (FTP) and Usenet.

The general interest in campus-wide information systems (CWISs) in higher education at the time, and the ease of setup of Gopher servers to create an instant CWIS with links to other sites' online directories and resources, were the factors contributing to Gopher's rapid adoption.

The name was coined by Anklesaria as a play on several meanings of the word "gopher". The University of Minnesota mascot is the gopher, a gofer is an assistant who "goes for" things, and a gopher burrows through the ground to reach a desired location.

Decline
The World Wide Web was in its infancy in 1991, and Gopher services quickly became established. By the late 1990s, Gopher had ceased expanding. Several factors contributed to Gopher's stagnation:

 In February 1993, the University of Minnesota announced that it would charge licensing fees for the use of its implementation of the Gopher server. Users became concerned that fees might also be charged for independent implementations. Gopher expansion stagnated, to the advantage of the World Wide Web, to which CERN disclaimed ownership. In September 2000, the University of Minnesota re-licensed its Gopher software under the GNU General Public License.
 Gopher client functionality was quickly duplicated by the early Mosaic web browser, which subsumed its protocol.
 Gopher has a more rigid structure than the free-form HTML of the Web. Every Gopher document has a defined format and type, and the typical user navigates through a single server-defined menu system to get to a particular document. This can be quite different from the way a user finds documents on the Web.
 Failure to follow the open systems model, bad publicity

Gopher remains in active use by its enthusiasts, and there have been attempts to revive Gopher on modern platforms and mobile devices. One attempt is The Overbite Project, which hosts various browser extensions and modern clients.

Server census
, there remained about 160 gopher servers indexed by Veronica-2, reflecting a slow growth from 2007 when there were fewer than 100. They are typically infrequently updated. On these servers Veronica indexed approximately 2.5 million unique selectors. A handful of new servers were being set up every year by hobbyists with over 50 having been set up and added to Floodgap's list since 1999. A snapshot of Gopherspace in 2007 circulated on BitTorrent and was still available in 2010. Due to the simplicity of the Gopher protocol, setting up new servers or adding Gopher support to browsers is often done in a tongue-in-cheek manner, principally on April Fools' Day.
In November 2014 Veronica indexed 144 gopher servers, reflecting a small drop from 2012, but within these servers Veronica indexed approximately 3 million unique selectors.
In March 2016 Veronica indexed 135 gopher servers, within which it indexed approximately 4 million unique selectors.
In March 2017 Veronica indexed 133 gopher servers, within which it indexed approximately 4.9 million unique selectors.
In May 2018 Veronica indexed 260 gopher servers, within which it indexed approximately 3.7 million unique selectors.
In May 2019 Veronica indexed 320 gopher servers, within which it indexed approximately 4.2 million unique selectors.
In January 2020 Veronica indexed 395 gopher servers, within which it indexed approximately 4.5 million unique selectors.
In February 2021 Veronica indexed 361 gopher servers, within which it indexed approximately 6 million unique selectors.
In February 2022 Veronica indexed 325 gopher servers, within which it indexed approximately 5 million unique selectors.

Technical details
The conceptualization of knowledge in "Gopher space" or a "cloud" as specific information in a particular file, and the prominence of the FTP, influenced the technology and the resulting functionality of Gopher.

Gopher characteristics 
Gopher is designed to function and to appear much like a mountable read-only global network file system (and software, such as gopherfs, is available that can actually mount a Gopher server as a FUSE resource). At a minimum, whatever can be done with data files on a CD-ROM, can be done on Gopher.

A Gopher system consists of a series of hierarchical hyperlinkable menus. The choice of menu items and titles is controlled by the administrator of the server.

Similar to a file on a Web server, a file on a Gopher server can be linked to as a menu item from any other Gopher server. Many servers take advantage of this inter-server linking to provide a directory of other servers that the user can access.

Protocol
IANA has assigned TCP port 70 to the Gopher protocol. The protocol is simple to negotiate, making it possible to browse without using a client.

User request
First, the client establishes a TCP connection with the server on port 70, the standard gopher port. The client then sends a string followed by a carriage return followed by a line feed (a "CR + LF" sequence). This is the selector, which identifies the document to be retrieved. If the item selector were an empty line, the default directory would be selected.

Server response
The server then replies with the requested item and closes the connection. According to the protocol, before the connection is closed, the server should send a full-stop (i.e., a period character) on a line by itself. However, not all servers conform to this part of the protocol and the server may close the connection without returning the final full-stop.    
The main type of reply from the server is a text or binary resource. Alternatively, the resource can be a menu: a form of structured text resource providing references to other resources.

Because of the simplicity of the Gopher protocol, tools such as netcat make it possible to download Gopher content easily from the command line:
 echo jacks/jack.exe | nc gopher.example.org 70 > jack.exe
The protocol is also supported by cURL as of 7.21.2-DEV.

Search request

The selector string in the request can optionally be followed by a tab character and a search string. This is used by item type 7.

Source code of a menu
Gopher menu items are defined by lines of tab-separated values in a text file. This file is sometimes called a gophermap. As the source code to a gopher menu, a gophermap is roughly analogous to an HTML file for a web page. Each tab-separated line (called a selector line) gives the client software a description of the menu item: what it is, what it's called, and where it leads. The client displays the menu items in the order that they appear in the gophermap.

The first character in a selector line indicates the item type, which tells the client what kind of file or protocol the menu item points to. This helps the client decide what to do with it. Gopher's item types are a more basic precursor to the media type system used by the Web and email attachments.

The item type is followed by the user display string (a description or label that represents the item in the menu); the selector (a path or other string for the resource on the server); the hostname (the domain name or IP address of the server), and the network port.

All lines in a gopher menu are terminated by "CR + LF".

For example: The following selector line generates a link to the "/home" directory at the subdomain gopher.floodgap.com, on port 70. The item type of  indicates that the resource is a Gopher menu. The string "Floodgap Home" is what the user sees in the menu.

 1Floodgap Home	/home	gopher.floodgap.com	70

Item types
In a Gopher menu's source code, a one-character code indicates what kind of content the client should expect. This code may either be a digit or a letter of the alphabet; letters are case-sensitive.

The technical specification for Gopher, defines 14 item types. The later gopher+ specification defined an additional 3 types. A one-character code indicates what kind of content the client should expect. Item type  is an error code for exception handling. Most gopher browsers still available, use these prefixes in their urls.

Here is an example gopher session where the user requires a gopher menu ( on the first line):

/Reference
1CIA World Factbook     /Archives/mirrors/textfiles.com/politics/CIA    gopher.quux.org 70
0Jargon 4.2.0   /Reference/Jargon 4.2.0 gopher.quux.org 70      +
1Online Libraries       /Reference/Online Libraries     gopher.quux.org 70     +
1RFCs: Internet Standards       /Computers/Standards and Specs/RFC      gopher.quux.org 70
1U.S. Gazetteer /Reference/U.S. Gazetteer       gopher.quux.org 70      +
iThis file contains information on United States        fake    (NULL)  0
icities, counties, and geographical areas.  It has      fake    (NULL)  0
ilatitude/longitude, population, land and water area,   fake    (NULL)  0
iand ZIP codes. fake    (NULL)  0
i       fake    (NULL)  0
iTo search for a city, enter the city's name.  To search        fake    (NULL) 0
ifor a county, use the name plus County -- for instance,        fake    (NULL) 0
iDallas County. fake    (NULL)  0

The gopher menu sent back from the server, is a sequence of lines each of which describes an item that can be retrieved. Most clients will display these as hypertext links, and so allow the user to navigate through gopherspace by following the links.
This menu includes a text resource (itemtype  on the third line), multiple links to submenus (itemtype , on the second line as well as lines 4-6) and a non-standard information message (from line 7 on), broken down to multiple lines by providing dummy values for selector, host and port.

External links
Historically, to create a link to a Web server, "GET /" was used as a pseudo-selector to emulate an HTTP GET request. John Goerzen created an addition to the Gopher protocol, commonly referred to as "URL links", that allows links to any protocol that supports URLs.

Gopher+
Gopher+ is a forward compatible enhancement to the Gopher protocol. Gopher+ works by sending metadata between the client and the server. The enhancement was never widely adopted by Gopher servers.

The client sends a tab followed by a +. A Gopher+ server will respond with a status line followed by the content the client requested. An item is marked as supporting Gopher+ in the Gopher directory listing by a tab + after the port (this is the case of some of the items in the example above).

Other features of Gopher+ include:

 Item attributes, which can include the items
 Administrator
 Last date of modification
 Different views of the file, like PostScript or plain text, or different languages
 Abstract, or description of the item
 Interactive queries

Client software

Gopher clients
These are clients, libraries, and utilities primarily designed to access gopher resources.

Other clients
Clients like web browsers, libraries, and utilities primarily designed to access world wide web resources, but which maintain(ed) gopher support.

 Browse, a browser for RISC OS
 Camino, versions 1.0 to 2.1.2, always uses port 70.
 Classilla, versions 9.0 to 9.3.4b1 as of March 2021, hardcoded to port 70 from 9.0 to 9.2; whitelisted ports from 9.2.1
 Dooble
 ELinks, versions 0.10.0 to 0.12pre6 as of October 2012, unmaintained browser with gopher build option. Fork felinks offers support as a build option
 Edbrowse, a line-oriented editor and browser with an interface like that of ed (text editor)
 Falkon, with plug-in only, requires Falkon ≥ 3.1.0 with both the KDE Frameworks Integration extension (shipped with Falkon ≥ 3.1.0) enabled and the (separate) kio_gopher plug-in ≥ 0.1.99 (first release for KDE Frameworks 5) installed
 Mozilla Firefox versions 0.1 to 3.6, built-in support dropped from Firefox 4.0 onwards; can be added back by installing one of the extensions by the Overbite Project
 Galeon version 2.0.7
 Google Chrome, with extension only, Burrow extension
 Internet Explorer for Mac version 5.2.3, PowerPC-only
 Internet Explorer, dropped with version 6: Support removed by MS02-047 from IE 6 SP1 can be re-enabled in the Windows Registry. Always uses port 70. Gopher support was disabled in Internet Explorer versions 5.x and 6 for Windows in August 2002 by a patch meant to fix a security vulnerability in the browser's Gopher protocol handler to reduce the attack surface which was included in IE6 SP1; however, it can be re-enabled by editing the Windows registry. In Internet Explorer 7, Gopher support was removed on the WinINET level.
 K-Meleon, dropped support
 Konqueror, with plug-in only, requires kio_gopher plug-in
 Line Mode Browser, since version 1.1, January 1992
 Lynx
 Mosaic, version 3.0
 NetSurf, under development, based on the cURL fetcher
 Netscape Navigator, version 9.0.0.6
 OmniWeb, since version 5.9.2 , first WebKit Browser to support Gopher
 Opera, Opera 9.0 included a proxy capability
 Pavuk, a web mirror (recursive download) software program
 SeaMonkey, version 1.0 to 2.0.14, built-in support dropped from SeaMonkey 2.1 onwards; could be added back to some versions with the Overbite project, but is no longer supported.
 Epiphany, until version 2.26.3, disabled with switch to WebKit
 WebPositive, a WebKit-based browser used in the Haiku operating system
 libwww, versions 1.0c  to 5.4.1 , libwww is an discontinued API for internet applications. A modern fork is maintained in Lynx

Browsers that do not natively support Gopher can still access servers using one of the available Gopher to HTTP gateways or proxy server that converts Gopher menus into HTML; known proxies are the Floodgap Public Gopher proxy and Gopher Proxy. Similarly, certain server packages such as GN and PyGopherd have built-in Gopher to HTTP interfaces. Squid Proxy software gateways any gopher:// URL to HTTP content, enabling any browser or web agent to access gopher content easily.

For Mozilla Firefox and SeaMonkey, Overbite extensions extend Gopher browsing and support the current versions of the browsers (Firefox Quantum v ≥57 and equivalent versions of SeaMonkey):
 OverbiteWX redirects gopher:// URLs to a proxy;
 OverbiteNX adds native-like support;
 for Firefox up to 56.*, and equivalent versions of SeaMonkey, OverbiteFF adds native-like support, but it is no longer maintained
OverbiteWX includes support for accessing Gopher servers not on port 70 using a whitelist and for CSO/ph queries. OverbiteFF always uses port 70.
For Chromium and Google Chrome, Burrow is available. It redirects gopher:// URLs to a proxy. In the past an Overbite proxy-based extension for these browsers was available but is no longer maintained and does not work with the current (>23) releases.
For Konqueror, Kio gopher is available.

The bandwidth-sparing simple interface of Gopher can be a good match for mobile phones and personal digital assistants (PDAs), The early 2010s saw a renewed interest in native Gopher clients for popular smartphones.

Gopher popularity was at its height at a time when there were still many equally competing computer architectures and operating systems. As a result, there are several Gopher clients available for Acorn RISC OS, AmigaOS, Atari MiNT, CMS, DOS, classic Mac OS, MVS, NeXT, OS/2 Warp, most UNIX-like operating systems, VMS, Windows 3.x, and Windows 9x. GopherVR was a client designed for 3D visualization, and there is even a Gopher client in MOO. The majority of these clients are hard-coded to work on TCP port 70.

Server software
Because the protocol is trivial to implement in a basic fashion, there are many server packages still available, and some are still maintained.

See also

References

External links
 List of public Gopher servers (Gopher link) (proxied link)
 An announcement of Gopher on the Usenet 8 October 1991
 Why is Gopher Still Relevant? — a position statement on Gopher's survival
 The Web may have won, but Gopher tunnels on — an article published by the technology discussion site Ars Technica about the Gopher community of enthusiasts as of 5 November 2009
 History of Gopher — Article in MinnPost
 Gopherpedia — Gopher interface for Wikipedia (Gopher link) (proxied link, by another proxy)
 Mark McCahill and Farhad Anklesaria – gopher inventors – explain the evolution of gopher: part 1, part 2
 Proposed Gopher+ Specification (gopher link)

 
History of the Internet
Internet Standards
University of Minnesota software
URI schemes